Sune  may refer to:

 Lalah Sune, a fictional character in Mobile Suit Gundam
 Sune (book series), a Swedish children's book series
 Sune (Forgotten Realms), a fictional deity in Forgotten Realms
 Sune (name), a given name

See also

 Soon (disambiguation)
 Sun (disambiguation)